Emagic was a music software and hardware company based in Rellingen, Germany and a satellite office in Grass Valley, California.  On July 1, 2002 Emagic was bought by Apple Computer. Emagic's Windows-based product offerings were discontinued on September 30, 2002.

History
The company was best known for its music sequencer, Logic. Logic stemmed from Creator, then Notator, made by C-Lab (the company's forerunner) for the Atari ST platform. In 1992, Emagic Soft- und Hardware GmbH was founded and Notator Logic was launched for Atari and Macintosh, followed by a version for Windows. The "Notator" was dropped from the name and the product was redesigned from the ground up, and the product became known under the name "Emagic Logic". When Apple bought Emagic, Logic had "Emagic" dropped from the title, and is now called Logic Pro. As a result of the purchase by Apple, the Windows version was discontinued.

The other major software product that Emagic offered was SoundDiver, an editor/librarian for hardware synthesizers. It communicated via MIDI and offered easy patch and sound management. While there was a beta version for Mac OS X, production of SoundDiver was discontinued in 2005.

Emagic formerly offered a line of audio interface hardware, the Audiowerk PCI cards, as well as USB units. A potential post-acquisition successor to these products, the unreleased Asteroid FireWire interface, was the subject of the Apple v. Does trade secret litigation.

Products

C-Lab software
 SuperTrack (for Commodore 64) - MIDI sequencer
 ScoreTrack - scorewriting
 Creator (for Atari ST) - MIDI sequencer
 Notator (for Atari ST) - MIDI sequencer and scorewriter
 Notator Alpha (for Atari ST) - cut-down educational version of Notator
 Aura (for Atari ST) - ear training
 Explorer 1000 - patch editor
 Explorer 32 - patch editor
 Explorer M1 - patch editor
 Midia - MIDI monitor/educational tool
 Polyframe - patch editor
 SoftLink
 Xalyser (for Atari ST) FM synthesizer

C-Lab hardware
 Unitor (for Atari) - SMPTE/EBU synchroniser
 Unitor 2 (for Atari) - SMPTE synchroniser/MIDI interface
 Combiner (for Atari) - cartridge expansion interface
 Export (for Atari) - MIDI interface
 Falcon mk I, mk II and mk X
 Steady Eye - SMPTE/VITC synchroniser
 Human Touch - Audio synchroniser

Emagic software
 Logic
 MicroLogic
 Sound Diver
 Waveburner
 Epic TDM
 Guitar Tuner
 Space Designer
 HearMaster - music theory training
 ZAP - audio file compression

Software instruments
 ES1 synthesizer
 ES2 synthesizer
 EVP73 Fender Rhodes VST instrument
 EVP88 electric piano 
 EXS24 sampler
 EXSP24 sample player
 EVB3 Hammond B3 instrument
 EVD6 Hohner Clavinet instrument
 EVOC20 vocoder

Emagic hardware
 LOG3 (for Atari ST) - MIDI interface
 LOG2mac - MIDI interface
 LOG2PC (c.1991) - ISA 1×1 MIDI interface card (rebranded Midiman MM-401 card)
 Audiowerk II - PCI soundcard
 Audiowerk8 - PCI soundcard
 Unitor 8 - 1U rackmount 8×8 MIDI interface
 AMT8 - 1U rackmount 8×8 MIDI interface
 MT4 - 2×4 MIDI interface
 EMI 6|2m - USB audio interface
 EMI 2|6 - USB audio interface
 Logic Control

References

Further reading

External links
Official site (archive.org)

Defunct software companies of Germany
Software companies of Germany
Apple Inc. acquisitions
2002 mergers and acquisitions